Aska is a two Michelin-starred, Scandinavian restaurant in Williamsburg, Brooklyn, founded by Swedish chef Fredrik Berselius. The name Aska means "ashes" in Swedish.

History 
Aska opened in 2012 at Kinfolk Studios in Williamsburg, Brooklyn. In the summer of 2016, Aska relocated to a restored 1860s warehouse building below the Williamsburg Bridge.

Awards 
In 2012, the Michelin guide awarded the restaurant one star and Bon Appetit named it one of the ten best new restaurants in America. In 2016, after relocating, the Michelin guide awarded Aska two stars. That same year, the restaurant earned a three star New York Times review by the critic Pete Wells and a four star review from Eater. The Michelin guide awarded Aska two stars again in 2017, 2018, 2019, and 2020.

Cookbook 
Berselius published his first cookbook, Aska, with Phaidon in the spring of 2018.

See also
 List of Michelin starred restaurants in New York City

References

External links 
 Official Website

Restaurants in Brooklyn
Michelin Guide starred restaurants in New York (state)
Scandinavian restaurants in the United States
Williamsburg, Brooklyn
European restaurants in New York City